The 1949–50 English National League season was the ninth season of the English National League, the top level ice hockey league in England. Seven teams participated in the league, and the Streatham Royals won the championship.

Regular season

External links
 Nottingham Panthers history site

Eng
Engl
Engl
English National League seasons
1949–50 in British ice hockey